Pigra is a comune (municipality) in the Province of Como in the Italian region Lombardy, located about  north of Milan and about  north of Como.

Pigra borders the following municipalities: Argegno, Blessagno, Colonno, Dizzasco, Laino.

Demographic evolution

References

Cities and towns in Lombardy